Vanadium(III) oxide is the inorganic compound with the formula V2O3.  It is a black solid prepared by reduction of V2O5 with hydrogen or carbon monoxide. It is a basic oxide dissolving in acids to give solutions of vanadium (III) complexes. V2O3 has the corundum structure. It is antiferromagnetic with a critical temperature of 160 K.  At this temperature there is an abrupt change in conductivity from metallic to insulating. This also distorts the crystal structure to a monoclinic space group: C2/c.

Upon exposure to air it gradually converts into indigo-blue V2O4.

In nature it occurs as the rare mineral karelianite.

References

Vanadium(III) compounds
Sesquioxides
Hematite group

Transition metal oxides